The Archdiocese of Cashel and Emly is an ecclesiastical territory or archdiocese of the Roman Catholic Church located in mid-western Ireland, and the metropolis of the eponymous ecclesiastical province.

The cathedral church of the archdiocese is the Cathedral of the Assumption in Thurles, County Tipperary.

The incumbent archbishop of the archdiocese is Kieran O'Reilly.

History 
The original dioceses of Cashel and Emly were established by the Synod of Ráth Breasail in 1111.

Diocese of Cashel 
The Diocese of Cashel was elevated to the rank of ecclesiastical province, which was roughly co-extensive with the traditional province of Munster, by the Synod of Kells in 1152. Since the Papal Legate, Giovanni Paparoni, awarded the pallium to Donat O'Lonergan in 1158, his successors ruled the ecclesiastical province of Cashelalso sometimes known as Munster  until 26 January 2015.

Diocese of Emly 
The Diocese of Emly took its name from the eponymous village in County Tipperary, which was the location of the principal church of the Eóghanacht dynasty.

Archdiocese of Cashel and Emly 
The original Roman Catholic dioceses of Cashel and Emly had been governed by the same bishop since 10 May 1718, with the Archbishop of Cashel acting as Apostolic Administrator of Emly, until they were united on 26 January 2015 to form the new metropolitan see of Cashel and Emly.

Church of Ireland 

Following the Reformation in Ireland, the two Church of Ireland dioceses of Cashel and Emly were united in 1569. This union lasted until 1976, at which point the diocese of Cashel was merged into the Diocese of Cashel and Ossory, while the diocese of Emly was merged into the Diocese of Limerick and Killaloe.

Geography

Ecclesiastical province 
The ecclesiastical province is one of four that make up the Catholic Church in Ireland; the others being Armagh, Dublin, and Tuam.

The six suffragan dioceses of the province are:
Cloyne
Cork and Ross
Kerry
Killaloe
Limerick
Waterford and Lismore

Archdiocese 
The archdiocese is divided into 46 parishes, which are spread across two counties: 35 in Tipperary and 11 in Limerick. The parishes are grouped into eight deaneries.

As of April 2018, there were 79 priests in the diocese.

Aside from the cathedral town of Thurles, the main towns in the diocese are Ballina, Caherconlish, Cashel, Fethard, Templemore and Tipperary.

Ordinaries

The following is a list of the ten most recent archbishops:
 Robert Laffan (1823–1833)
 Michael Slattery (1833–1857)
 Patrick Leahy (1857–1875)
 Thomas Croke (1875–1902)
 Thomas Fennelly (1901–1913)
 John Harty (1913–1946)
 Jeremiah Kinane (1946–1959)
 Thomas Morris (1959–1988)
 Dermot Clifford (1988–2014)
 Kieran O'Reilly (2014–present)

See also
 Bishop of Emly
 Synod of Cashel

References

External links
 Catholic-Hierarchy
 GCatholic

 
 Cashel
1718 establishments in Ireland
Roman Catholic dioceses and prelatures established in the 18th century
Religion in County Limerick
Religion in County Tipperary
Roman Catholic Ecclesiastical Province of Cashel